Hoffnungstal or Hoffnungsthal may refer to:

 Hoffnungsthal, South Australia, an abandoned German pioneer settlement
 Hoffnungstal, a former name of Tsebrykove, Ukraine
 Hoffnungstal, a district of Much, North Rhine-Westphalia, Germany
 Hoffnungstal, a village in the Omsk Oblast, in southwestern Siberia, Russia
 Hoffnungstal, an abandoned village near Mikolajiwka, Tarutyne Raion, Odessa Oblast, Ukraine
 Hoffnungsthal, a suburb of Rösrath, North Rhine-Westphalia, Germany
 Hoffnungsthal, part of the municipality Goosefeld in Schleswig-Holstein